Wilhelm Stein (May 15, 1895 - June 26, 1944) was a German engineer, a Jewish resistance fighter, and Holocaust victim.

Life

Stein was born in modern-day Sankt Goar. Despite only receiving an elementary school education, Stein managed to secure an enrollment in an engineering establishment, and following his graduation was gainfully employed by the lucrative Krupp family. It was here that Stein encountered the Bästlein-Jacob-Abshagen Group, and subsequently began aiding in their efforts in illegally working against the Nazi regime. Eventually, the Gestapo became aware of Stein's involvement and interred him in the Hamburg Remand Prison. The local Volksgerichtshof chapter adamantly opposed Stein and he was swiftly convicted, and executed in the summer of 1944, just nine months before Germany would surrender to the Allied Powers.

Today Stein is remembered by a street dedicated to his name in Hamburg, and in several works by Gunter Demnig.

Literature 
 The Persecution and Murder of the Jews of Hamburg 1933 - 1945: History, Testimony, Remembrance / Institute for the History of the German Jews', Hamburg 2006, 
 The Bästlein-Jacob-Abshagen group. Report on the anti-fascist resistance in Hamburg and on the water's edge during the Second World War. Dietz, Berlin, capital of the GDR 1959, pp. 216f.

1895 births
1944 deaths
German Jews who died in the Holocaust
Engineers from Rhineland-Palatinate
People killed by Nazi Germany
German resistance members
Jews in the German resistance
People from Rhein-Hunsrück-Kreis